Más allá de la aventura is a 1980 Argentine film directed by Oscar Barney Finn.

Cast
Andy Pruna		
Catherine Alric		
Marcos Zucker	
Mario Casado		
Marcelo Vittola		
Guillermo Tonnellier		
Lilian Riera		
François Dounlonger		
Mariano van Heldren	
Oscar Barney Finn

External links 
 

1980 films
Argentine mystery films
1980s Spanish-language films
Films directed by Oscar Barney Finn
1980s Argentine films